The 2012 WPSL Elite season was the only season of the WPSL Elite, an upper-level division of the WPSL, one of America's two semi-pro leagues (opposite the W-League).  The regular season consisted of fourteen matches per team in a double-round-robin format, played between May 10 and July 22.  The regular season was followed by a playoff series.

The 2012 season included three former WPS teams: 2011 WPS champions Western New York Flash, WUSA alumni Boston Breakers, and 2011 WPSL finalists Chicago Red Stars.

Teams

Regular season standings

Match results

Results
Home teams listed first

May

June

July

Statistical leaders

Top scorers

Top assists

Playoffs

Semi-finals

Championship

References

External links
 WPSL Elite homepage

Women's Premier Soccer League seasons
1
Women's Premier Soccer League Elite seasons